Hugh Grant is a British actor. His career spans four decades. He has been recognised as an international film star since 1994, and has received a Golden Globe Award and a British Academy Film Award. His films have collectively grossed more than $2.4 billion worldwide. The following are his film and television credits.

Filmography

Film

Television

Awards and nominations

References

External links
 
 Hugh Grant at Box Office Mojo
 Hugh Grant Filmography at the New York Times

Male actor filmographies
British filmographies